The England women's cricket team played the India women's cricket team in February and March 2019. The tour consisted of three Women's One Day Internationals (WODIs), which formed part of the 2017–20 ICC Women's Championship, and three Women's Twenty20 International (WT20) matches. India Women won the WODI series 2–1.

The second WT20I match of the series was the 600th Women's Twenty20 International match to be played. England Women won the WT20I series 3–0.

Squads

Harmanpreet Kaur was ruled out of India's WODI squad due to injury and was replaced by Harleen Deol. Sophie Ecclestone was ruled out of England's WT20I squad, after suffering a broken hand during the WODI series. Alex Hartley was named as Ecclestone's replacement in England's WT20I squad.

Tour match

50-over match: Indian Board President's Women XI v England Women

WODI series

1st WODI

2nd WODI

3rd WODI

WT20I series

1st WT20I

2nd WT20I

3rd WT20I

References

External links
 Series home at ESPN Cricinfo

2019 in women's cricket
2017–20 ICC Women's Championship
2018–19 Indian women's cricket
2019 in English cricket
cricket
International cricket competitions in 2018–19
India 2018-19
England 2018-19